Ostapova is a rural locality (a village) in Stepanovskoye Rural Settlement, Kudymkarsky District, Perm Krai, Russia. The population was 41 as of 2010. There are 2 streets.

Geography 
Ostapova is located 9 km southeast of Kudymkar (the district's administrative centre) by road. Tarova is the nearest rural locality.

References 

Rural localities in Kudymkarsky District